The Sixth Form Bolton is a further education college for students aged 16-19 and is located in Bolton, Greater Manchester, England.

Overview 
Bolton Sixth Form College is the largest further education college in the Metropolitan Borough of Bolton. The college has around 1700 full-time students.

History 
This college is the result of the merger of Bolton North and Bolton South Colleges in the late 1990s to form a single Sixth Form College. Today the college is located on Deane Road in Bolton. This campus opened in September 2010 and replaced the former North campus, which was situated on Smithills Dean Road. The college also previously had a second campus located on Queen Street in Farnworth. This campus opened in July 2008 and replaced the former South campus on Lever Edge Lane in Daubhill. However the college closed its Farnworth Campus in September 2014.

Notable alumni 
 Sajid Mahmood, Lancashire and England cricketer
 Clive Myrie, BBC newsreader
 Rebecca Royle, Educating Greater Manchester Star
 Matthew Walton, Clarinet Virtuoso
 Chelci Hayes, Educating Greater Manchester Star
 Paris Hayes, Youngest Parliamentary Candidate in Bolton and Political Activist

References 

Buildings and structures in Bolton
Education in the Metropolitan Borough of Bolton
Sixth form colleges in Greater Manchester